Clinus taurus, the bull klipfish, is a species of clinid that occurs in subtropical waters of the Atlantic Ocean from Namibia to South Africa where it occurs in the tidal and subtidal zones.  This species can reach a maximum length of  TL.

References

taurus
Fish described in 1908
Taxa named by John Dow Fisher Gilchrist
Taxa named by William Wardlaw Thompson